Tadeusz Żbikowski (29 March 1930, in Warsaw – 11 November 1989, in Warsaw) was a Polish Sinologist, professor of Warsaw University, translator of Chinese literature.

Works
 Religie Chin (Religions of China) (with Olgierd Wojtasiewicz)
 Religie Archipelagu Malajskiego (Religions of Malay Archipelago)
 Religie Australii i Oceanii (Religions of Australia and Oceania)
 Legendy i pradzieje Kraju Środka (Legends and histories of Country of the Center)
 Konfucjusz (Confucius)

Translations
 
 
 Księga powinności synowskiej
 Jang Czu

References
 

Polish sinologists
Polish translators
1930 births
1989 deaths
20th-century translators
Scholars of Chinese opera